The Crippled Hand is a 1916 American silent drama film directed by David Kirkland and Robert Z. Leonard and starring Leonard, Gladys Brockwell and Marc B. Robbins.

Cast
 Robert Z. Leonard as The Rich Man 
 Ella Hall as The Little Girl
 Marc B. Robbins as The Manager 
 Gladys Brockwell as The Prima Donna
 Kingsley Benedict as 	The Cripple

References

Bibliography
 Slide, Anthony. Silent Players: A Biographical and Autobiographical Study of 100 Silent Film Actors and Actresses. University Press of Kentucky, 2002.

External links
 

1916 films
1916 drama films
1910s English-language films
American silent feature films
Silent American drama films
American black-and-white films
Films directed by Robert Z. Leonard
Films directed by David Kirkland
Universal Pictures films
1910s American films